Penestanan is a village just outside the town of Ubud, in Bali, Indonesia. It has been known as an artist's village since the 1930s when Walter Spies lived there. Another notable resident is Arie Smit.

Gallery

Populated places in Bali
Balinese art